Archbishop Thomas D'Souza is a serving Archbishop of Calcutta and member of the Commission for Education of the Catholic Bishops' Conference of India.

Early life 
He was born in Adyarpadav - Mangalore, Karnataka on 26 Aug 1950.
He was baptised at Holy Family Church, Omzoor. He did his primary education from St. Ligorious Higher Primary school and ever since his childhood he has been known for his humbleness and simplicity.

Priesthood 
He was ordained a Catholic priest on 16 Apr 1977.

Episcopate 
He was appointed by Pope John Paul II as Bishop of Bagdogra on 14 Jun 1997 and was Ordained on 25 Jan 1998. He was Appointed Coadjutor Archbishop of Calcutta on 12 Mar 2011 by Pope Benedict XVI. He succeeded as Archbishop of Calcutta on 23 Feb 2012.

References

1950 births
Living people
21st-century Roman Catholic archbishops in India
Christian clergy from Mangalore
Bishops appointed by Pope John Paul II
Bishops appointed by Pope Benedict XVI